This article is a list of the Los Angeles Rams broadcasters.

The Los Angeles Rams were the first National Football League (NFL) team to televise both their home and away games during the 1950 NFL season. The 1951 NFL Championship Game was the first Championship Game televised coast-to-coast.

St. Louis
After relocating to St. Louis, from 1995–1999 the Rams games were broadcast on KSD 93.7 FM. Preseason games not shown on a national broadcast network were seen on KTVI, Channel 2, and were also seen in L.A. on KCOP, "MyNetworkTV channel 13."

Radio
From 2000–2008, KLOU FM 103.3 was the Rams flagship station with Steve Savard as the play-by-play announcer. Until October 2005, Jack Snow had been the color analyst for nearly 20 years, dating back to the team's first stint in the Los Angeles area. Snow left the booth after suffering an illness and died in January 2006. Former Rams offensive line coach and former St. Louis Cardinals head coach Jim Hanifan joined the KLOU as the color analyst the year after Jack Snow's departure. They were joined by analyst D'Marco Farr and sideline reporter Malcolm Briggs.

From 2009– 2015, the Rams' flagship radio station was 101 ESPN which was at the time a new sports station in St. Louis. For these broadcasts, Steve Savard was the play by play announcer, flanked by color commentator D'Marco Farr. Brian Stull served as the sideline reporter, and the pregame and postgame coverage was anchored by St. Louis coaching legend Jim Hanifan, along with hosts Randy Karraker for pregame and Cliff Saunders for postgame, among other 101 ESPN personalities.

Los Angeles

Radio

The Los Angeles Rams’ flagship radio stations are KSPN (710 AM) and KCBS-FM (93.1 FM) in the Los Angeles market.  Other stations around California, including 50,000 watt AM 1090 XEPRS in Tijuana-San Diego ("The Mighty 1090") also carry the broadcasts.

The announcers are Pac-12 network play-by-play announcer J.B. Long and former Pro Bowl running back Maurice Jones-Drew as the color analyst, with D'Marco Farr serving as sideline reporter. In the team's original Los Angeles stint, 710 AM (in its KMPC years) was the team's radio flagship for nearly the team's entire first tenure in the region.

Television

ABC affiliate KABC-TV serves as the team’s official preseason television home. From 2016-2019, CBS affiliate KCBS-TV served as the team's preseason television home. Both stations, in conjunction with the Rams, also had produce ancillary team programming, with KCBS airing the Rams on 2:The Coaches Show (hosted by KCBS-TV sports anchor and director Jim Hill) on Saturday evenings during game weeks. Rams preseason games are also carried in Spanish, with Univision-owned KMEX and its sister station, KFTR (UniMas) originating the broadcasts. Univision's KABE and KBTF (UniMas) broadcast those games in the neighboring Bakersfield market.

The majority of Rams regular season games are aired on Fox affiliate, KTTV, by virtue of being members of Fox having the rights to NFC games, as part of parent network Fox's NFL Sunday afternoon package. When the Rams host an AFC opponent, games air on CBS affiliate KCBS-TV as part of CBS's coverage and Sunday Night Football games that air on KNBC. Monday Night Football games are also televised in the Los Angeles area on KABC-TV when the Rams play a Monday night game.

References

 
Lists of National Football League announcers by team
broadcasters